The OK Diner is a privately owned roadside restaurant chain in the United Kingdom. The restaurants have a retro, 1950s-style American diner theme with popular 1950s music, chequerboard flooring, booth seating, plenty of chrome details and 1950s memorabilia on the walls. 

The concept was created by John Roebuck and Tony Horsfall for City Centre Restaurants (now The Restaurant Group) and was sold to co-directors Ian Hendry and Dafydd Poole in a management buyout in 2001. In 2014, Poole bought out his partner.

Current locations
As of March 2023 the Ok Diner chain has nine restaurants.

 A1 Northbound – Carlton-on-Trent, Nottinghamshire
 A1 Southbound – New Fox, Colsterworth, Lincolnshire
 A1 Northbound – Tickencote, Rutland
 A5 – Cannock, Staffordshire 
 A19 Services Southbound – Elwick, County Durham 
 A38 Southbound – Egginton, Derbyshire
 A49 – Leominster, Herefordshire
 A55 Gateway Services – Northop Hall, Flintshire
 Mile End Roundabout, Oswestry, Shropshire

References

External links

Companies based in Cheshire
Diners
Middlewich
Restaurant groups in the United Kingdom